William Elvin Jackson was an aviation electronics engineer who contributed to the fields of aeronautical navigation, communications and air traffic control. Jackson assisted in the development of nearly all of the electronic aids to air navigation and air traffic control during his careers in both industry and government. Those contributions included the advancement of instrument landing systems (ILS), very high frequency omni-ranges (VHFOR), and distance measuring equipment, all of which are the worldwide standard systems in use today.

Mr. Jackson was the editor of "The Federal Airways System," a publication of the Institute of Electrical and Electronics Engineers (IEEE) that traces 40 years of technical engineering achievements that enabled the prevalence of air transportation in public inter-city, intercontinental and international private and business travel.

William Jackson graduated from Brown University in Providence, Rhode Island.  The yearbook foreshadowed his future.  From the Brown University Yearbook 1925:  

In the mid-1920s, Jackson, while living in Schenectady, New York, was a central part of a worldwide group of thousands of experimenting wireless engineers, referred to as "hams". They used ham radios and Morse code to communicate among themselves between 42 countries, all in an effort to improve code transmission when two-way communication was the first wireless technology.  At the time, he was employed with General Electric in its radio department.

References

Amateur radio people